Rebecca Petch (born 9 July 1998) is a New Zealand cyclist who competes in BMX Racing and track cycling. She competed at the 2020 Summer Olympics, in Women's BMX race. 

From Te Awamutu, Petch started riding BMX aged 3. At the UCI BMX World Championships she came 15th at Rock Hill in 2017, she finished 11th in Baku in 2018, and 25th in Heusden-Zolder in 2019.

On 17 June 2021, Petch was selected in her country's Olympic squad as New Zealand's sole BMX rider for the delayed Tokyo 2020 Summer Games.

Petch was a gold medalist at the 2022 Commonwealth Games in the  Women’s Team sprint competition.

References

External links
 
 
 
 

1998 births
Living people
BMX riders
New Zealand female cyclists
Olympic cyclists of New Zealand
Cyclists at the 2020 Summer Olympics
Commonwealth Games competitors for New Zealand
Commonwealth Games gold medallists for New Zealand
Commonwealth Games medallists in cycling
Cyclists at the 2022 Commonwealth Games
Sportspeople from Waikato
People from Te Awamutu
21st-century New Zealand women
Medallists at the 2022 Commonwealth Games